The 2010 General Strike in Spain was a general strike called for Wednesday, 29 September 2010 in Spain by the two main Spanish trade union centrals—Comisiones Obreras and Unión General de Trabajadores—against the labor reform of 2010, promoted by the government of José Luis Rodríguez Zapatero and approved in the Congress of Deputies on 9 September 2010, entering into force on 19 September 2010, and against the reform of the public pension system announced by the Government of Spain.

Other unions (CGT, USO), national and international organizations and associations (Attac) joined the call. The strike was against labour reform, wages cut in public sector and pension freezes. It was organised by CCOO, UGT and CGT. Ten Million workers went out of work to participate in the strike. In the specific cases of Navarra and the Basque Country, the LAB and ELA unions convened the strike for June 29, 2010.

See also
 List of strikes in Spain
 Anti-austerity movement in Spain

References

General strikes in Spain
2010 in Spain
2010 protests
Protests in Spain